The 2018 CAF Super Cup (officially the 2018 Total CAF Super Cup for sponsorship reasons) was the 26th CAF Super Cup, an annual football match in Africa organized by the Confederation of African Football (CAF), between the winners of the previous season's two CAF club competitions, the CAF Champions League and the CAF Confederation Cup.

The match was played between Wydad AC of Morocco, the 2017 CAF Champions League winners, and TP Mazembe of the Democratic Republic of the Congo, the 2017 CAF Confederation Cup winners. It was hosted by Wydad AC at the Stade Mohammed V in Casablanca on 24 February 2018.

Wydad AC won the match 1–0 to claim their first CAF Super Cup title.

Teams

Venue

Format
The CAF Super Cup was played as a single match, with the CAF Champions League winners hosting the match. If the score was tied at the end of regulation, extra time would not be played, and the penalty shoot-out would be used to determine the winner (CAF Champions League Regulations XXVII and CAF Confederation Cup Regulations XXV).

Match

Details

Prize money
Prize money shared between CAF Champions League winner and CAF Confederations Cup winner in CAF Super Cup are as following :

See also
2017 CAF Champions League Final
2017 CAF Confederation Cup Final

References

External links
Super Cup 2018, CAFonline.com

2018
Super
Wydad AC matches
TP Mazembe matches
February 2018 sports events in Africa
International club association football competitions hosted by Morocco